Oppressing the Masses is the second album by San Francisco Bay Area thrash metal band Vio-lence. It was originally released in July 13, 1990 via Megaforce Records. The original print (20,000) contained the song "Torture Tactics" but all copies were destroyed because of Atlantic Records' objection to the lyrical content. However, that song can be found on the Japanese version of the album. The re-release version contains the tracks from Torture Tactics EP.

Track listing

Credits 
Sean Killian – vocals
Phil Demmel – lead guitar
Robb Flynn – rhythm guitar
Dean Dell – bass
Perry Strickland – drums

References 

1990 albums
Vio-lence albums
Megaforce Records albums
Albums produced by Alex Perialas